Owen Diaz vs. Tesla was a discrimination lawsuit filed against electric car manufacturer Tesla, Inc. The plaintiff, Owen Diaz, was an elevator operator at the Tesla Fremont Factory in California between 2015 and 2016. The lawsuit stated that Diaz faced constant harassment including racial slurs. According to the state's Department of Fair Employment and Housing, the Fremont factory is racially segregated and Black workers testify that they are subjected to racist slurs, racial drawings, and are given the most menial and physically demanding work. Working conditions at the plant are so unacceptable, the organization states, that many Black employees have been forced to quit. J. Bernard Alexander III, one of Diaz's lawyers, told jurors that the use of the “n-word” was pervasive and virtually everywhere at Fremont factory.

In 2021, a jury found for the plaintiff, and ordered Tesla to pay  in damages, of which $6.9 million were for emotional distress and $130 million were punitive damages. The verdict is one of the most significant in this class of lawsuit. In April 2022, federal judge William Orrick upheld the jury finding of Tesla's liability but reduced the total award down to $15 million. Tesla had sought to limit the damage to $600,000 in total.

References

United States lawsuits